Chung Ju-yung or Jung Joo-young (November 25, 1915 – March 21, 2001), was a South Korean entrepreneur, businessman and the founder of Hyundai Groups, one of the largest chaebols in South Korea. Raised as the eldest son of a poor Korean farmer, he became the richest man in South Korea. Chung was an integral part to the rapid development of Korea's economy, growing Hyundai Heavy Industries to be the largest ship builder in the world, as well as growing Hyundai Motor Group into the largest automobile manufacturer in Korea, and the third largest in the world. Chung was also a vital contributor to the development of South Korea's infrastructure after the Korean War's destruction of infrastructure, such as constructing the Gyeongbu Expressway in 1970, connecting the capital, Seoul, to the port city of Busan, in alliance with the President Park Chung Hee.

Chung's business ventures steered through the tumultuous times of Japanese colonial rule in Korea as well as the post-Korean War stresses on the economy.
Chung explained his success in his statement: "Our people succeeded because they devoted their enterprising spirits. They used the forces of other mind. Conviction ... creates indomitable efforts. This is the key to (true) miracles ... Man's potential is limitless."

Life

Early life
Chung Ju-yung was born in Tongchon, Kangwondo, Chōsen (today located in Kangwon Province in North Korea). Born to a large impoverished family of peasants, he was the eldest of seven children. As a young boy, Chung dreamed of becoming a school teacher, but his hopes were cut short because the restrictive environment at the time kept the family stuck in poverty, effectively keeping Chung away from higher educational opportunities. Despite the setbacks, Chung was able to attend a local Confucian school run by his grandfather whenever his time was not taken up by tasks on the family farm.

Chung's talent for business became apparent during his trips into town where he would sell wood. The fast-paced atmosphere of the town along with the articles in newspapers Chung read sparked his imagination; he soon grew tired of the poverty that he and his family had to endure.

First escape attempt
At the age of sixteen, Chung and a friend decided to travel to the city of Seishin (Chongjin, currently in North Korea) for work in hopes of escaping the harsh realities of farm life. After a 15-mile trek through the most dangerous parts of the Paechun valley, the pair reached the town of Kōgen (Kowon, currently in North Korea) where they took up jobs as construction workers. They worked long hours for low pay but Chung enjoyed the fact that he could earn money independently. Chung and his friend continued the work for two months until Chung's father learned of their whereabouts.

Second escape attempt
The journey that Chung and his friend had embarked on made him realize his passion for civil engineering and gave him a sense of accomplishment. Once he returned to his home village of Gasan-ri in Tsūsen-gun, he devised another escape plan: this time towards Keijō (formerly Hanseong, currently Seoul). With two companions, Chung left for Keijō in April 1933. The journey seemed destined for failure, especially since one of the boys was caught by a sibling early on. More misfortune came upon them when Chung and his friend were conned by a stranger who promised them jobs but instead took all of their money. The journey came to an end when Chung's father found the two staying at Chung's grandfather's house nearby.

Third escape attempt
Chung once again found himself in Asan, where he remained for a year helping his father work on the family farm. Once his duties to the family were complete, Chung decided it was time to make another attempt at getting out of poverty. He managed to get a train ticket for 70 won by selling one of his father's cows. Once he arrived in Keijō, Chung enrolled himself in a local bookkeeping school hoping to start a career as an accountant. Things went smoothly for two months when his father managed to find him and after a mild argument, took him back to Gasan.

Rice merchant
In 1933, at the age of 18, Chung decided to make a fourth attempt to escape. He left during the night with a friend who was trying to escape a forced marriage. Once Chung reached Keijō, he jumped at any job he could find. He worked first as a laborer at Jinsen Harbor (Incheon, currently in South Korea), a construction worker at Boseong Professional School and as a handyman for a starch syrup factory.

After working at the syrup factory for nearly a year, Chung managed to land a job as a deliveryman at the Bokheung Rice Store in Keijō. Chung's new job offered him room for advancement and as he became more successful at it, he decided to stay on full-time. He eventually won the praise of the rice store's core customers which impressed the owner so much that he allowed Chung to manage the store's accounting after only six months on the job. His experiences as the store accountant helped him to thoroughly develop his business sense.

In 1937, the owner of the rice store became ill and decided it would be in his best interest to give the store to Chung. At 22 years of age, Chung became the store owner and changed the name of the store to Kyungil Rice Store. The store grew and made good profits until early 1939 when Japan, in its war efforts to secure rice supplies for the country and its military, imposed an oppressive rice-rationing system which forced Korean businesses out of trading rice.

Creation of Hyundai

A-do Service Garage
Chung returned to his village once his business failed and remained there until 1940, when he decided to try again in Keijō. After considering the reality of restrictions imposed on Koreans in certain industries by the Japanese colonial government, Chung decided to enter the automobile repair business. Using a service garage he purchased from a friend, Chung started the A-do Service Garage on a 3,000 won loan. Within three years, the number of employees grew from 20 to 70 and Chung was able to earn a good income. In 1943, the Japanese colonial government forced the garage to merge with a steel plant as part of the war effort. Although his businesses were shut down due to suppression by the Japanese, Chung returned to Gasan with 50,000 yen in savings to try to make the best of the situation.

Hyundai
In 1946, after the liberation of Korea from Japanese control, Chung started Hyundai and Hyundai Civil Industries in anticipation of the post-war reconstruction and industrialization. Chung won major government contracts and became responsible for building much of South Korea's transportation infrastructure, including the Soyang Dam in 1967, the Gyeongbu Expressway in 1970, the world's largest shipyard in Ulsan, the Kori Nuclear Power Plant among others. Chung also won contracts from the United States Forces Korea to build facilities for their personnel as his younger brother could speak English and was on good terms with the U.S. Army engineers.

During the North Korean invasion of 1950, Chung abandoned his construction projects and fled with his younger brother to Busan for safety. His son, Chung Mong-joon was born there. Chung continued to build onto the company by gathering any kind of work he could get from the United Nations Command and the Korean Ministry of Transportation. Once Seoul was retaken by U.N. forces, Chung reestablished the company and continued to gather more work from the Americans.

From then on, Chung continued to grow and diversify the company into one of South Korea's major chaebol (conglomerate). With no experience in shipbuilding, he created the Ulsan shipyard, the largest shipyard in the world. The first vessel was completed in three years (rather than the expected five) as Chung had the shipyard and vessel built simultaneously. He introduced the Hyundai Pony in 1975 and the Hyundai Excel in 1986 using European expertise.

Later years

From the 1980s until recently, the Hyundai Group was split into many satellite groups. Chung had a very successful career. In Seosan, he carried out a successful reclamation project, using a decommissioned oil tanker as a cofferdam. In 1998, he herded 1,001 cows through the Korean Demilitarized Zone to North Korea, which he claimed was a repayment 1,000 times over for a cow he took to afford his ticket when he escaped his father's farm. Chung was the first civilian to cross the Korean DMZ since the division of Korea. He was the first to propose the Geumgangsan sightseeing excursions. He founded the Hyundai Heavy Steel Company which developed a non-dock ship-making method.

Chung's philanthropy distinguished him from the other businessmen of his generation. In 1977, he founded the Asan Foundation with a scope of activities comparable to those of the Ford or Rockefeller foundations. The foundation was organized into four major areas of service: medical support, social welfare, research and development, and a scholarship fund. Through its efforts, the foundation established nine hospitals throughout South Korea, built Ulsan Medical College, and funded the Asan Life Sciences Research Institute. The foundation also initiated cooperative arrangements between industry and academic institutions by supporting such academic research as the Sinyoung Research Fund.

In 1982, Chung received the Golden Plate Award of the American Academy of Achievement.

Political activities 
Chung is credited with successfully lobbying for South Korea to host the 1988 Summer Olympics. This success highlighted the accomplishments of his generation in the eyes of the world and became a source of great pride to the people of Seoul. In 1992 the International Olympic Committee awarded Chung an IOC Medallion for his contributions to sports as a vehicle of international understanding.

Chung ran unsuccessfully as a Unification National Party presidential candidate for the 1992 South Korean presidential election.

Chung also worked to normalize relations between the two Koreas. In 1998, at the age of 82, he worked with the South Korean government to provide economic assistance to the North. President Kim Dae-jung wanted to provide a $100 million donation as a way to jump-start economic development in North Korea under his Sunshine Policy. However, Kim could not find a legal way to transfer the funds. He turned to Chung, who was already negotiating a large program with the North. Kim persuaded Chung to increase his investment by $100 million with money from secret loans provided by the government-controlled Korea Development Bank. The historic 2000 inter-Korean summit took place, with Chung traveling across the border in a motorcade of cars containing some 1001 "unification cows" as a gift to the North Korean people.

Death
Chung died at the age of 85 of natural causes at his home in Seoul, and he was buried in accordance to Buddhist and Confucian customary rites. His wife, Byun Joong-seok, died on August 17, 2008, at the age of 88, due in part to long-term heart complications, and was buried in a family graveyard in Hanam, along with her husband and their son.

Legacy
As one of the most recognized and admired business men in Korean history, Chung's identity still pervades modern Korean society and industry. Business-related events emphasizing creativity and innovation have been named after him. Much of the current success of Hyundai is widely attributed to Chung's insight and resolution, ideals that the contemporary Hyundai leadership vow to keep.

Books 
 Trials May Not Fail (시련은 있어도 실패는 없다)
 Born in This Land (이 땅에 태어나서)
Your Lips Need to Burn if You Plan to Succeed (입이 뜨거워야 성공할 수 있다)

Family

Chung Ju-yung had five brothers and one sister; he had eight sons and one daughter with his wife. In addition, he had two illegitimate daughters with a younger woman, with whom he started a relationship in 1973; these daughters were not acknowledged until after his death.

Brothers

  (1920–2006). After leaving the Hyundai Group, he founded the Halla Group, whose interests included Mando Machinery, Halla Cement, Halla Construction, Halla Heavy Industries, and Halla Climate Control Corp.
  (1925–2015). After working for Hyundai Engineering & Construction he ventured by taking Hyundai Cement with him to form the Sungwoo Business Group, which includes Hyundai Cement, Hyundai Welding, Sungwoo Automotive.
  (1928–2005). Founder of Hyundai Motor. Left the Hyundai Group with Hyundai Development Co., Ltd., the leading housing builder in Korea.
 Chung Shin-yung (1931–1962). Died in a car accident in Germany while working as a journalist for a Korean newspaper company. His only son, Chung Mong-hyuk, ran Hyundai Oilbank, the third largest oil refiner in Korea.
  (1936–2021). Founder of the KCC Chemical (Keumkang) group, Korea's leading paint and glass maker.

Children

  (1934–1982). Died in a car accident in Gimcheon, in a Hyundai-built Ford Granada, on the Gyeongbu Expressway leaving two daughters.
 Chung Mong-koo (1938–). Currently the head of the Hyundai Kia Automotive Group, the second largest business group in Korea. Assumed control of Hyundai Engineering & Construction in 2011.
  (1942–). Currently the chairman of the Hyundai Department Store Group, one of the largest retailers in South Korea.
 Chung Kyung-hee (1944–). The only daughter of Chung ju-yung and Byeon Joong-seok.
  (1945–1990). Committed suicide leaving three sons. His oldest son Chung Il-sun is currently the president of BNG Steel, a member of the Hyundai Kia Automotive Group.
 Chung Mong-hun (1948–2003). Former chairman of the Hyundai Group and heir apparent to his father before he committed suicide in August 2003; this left his wife  (1956–) in control of the Hyundai Group.
 Chung Mong-joon (1951–). Politician and de facto owner of Hyundai Heavy Industries, the world's largest shipbuilding firm, as well as vice-chairman of FIFA.
  (1955–). Chairman of Hyundai Marine & Fire Insurance, Korea's third largest non-life insurer.
  (1959–). Former chairman of Hyundai Merchant Bank and Kangwon Bank.
 Chung Chung-in (Grace Jeong) (1979–), actress.
 Chung Chung-im (Elizabeth Jeong) (1981–), advertiser.

Nephews

via Chung In-yung (1920–2006)
 Chung Mong-guk.
 Chung Mong-won. Chairman of Halla Group. Recently reacquired Mando Machinery.
via Chung-Soon-yung (1925–2015)
 Chung Mong-sun. Chairman of Sungwoo Group (Hyundai Cement).
 Chung Mong-suk. Chairman of Hyundai Welding Co., Ltd.
 Chung Mong-hoon. Chairman of Sungwoo Hyokwang International Co.
 Chung Mong-yong. Chairman of Sungwoo Automotive.
via Chung Se-yung (1928–2005)
 Chung Mong-gyu. Former Chairman of Hyundai Motor. Current Chairman of Hyundai Development Co., Ltd.
via Chung Shin-yong (1931–1962)
 Chung Mong-hyuk. Former President of Hyundai Oil & Hyundai Petrochemical; current chairman of Hyundai Corporation.
via Chung Sang-yung (1936–)
 Chung Mong-jin. Chairman of KCC.
 Chung Mong-ik. Vice-Chairman of KCC.
 Chung Mong-yeol. President of KCC Construction Co., Ltd.

Notes and references

Further reading

External links

  Chung Ju-yung
  Chung Ju Yung Cyber Museum
 Schuman, Michael "Chung Ju Yung". Time.
 "Hyundai Group's Honorary Chairman: Autobiography"

1915 births
2001 deaths
People from Tongchon County
South Korean founders of automobile manufacturers
Hyundai people
20th-century South Korean businesspeople